Sarah Hawe (born 23 July 1987) is an Australian rower. She is an Australian national champion, an Olympian and a current world champion winning the 2019 and 2017 world titles in the coxless four. She was a winner of the Remenham Challenge Cup at the 2018 Henley Royal Regatta in the Australian women's eight. She rowed in the Australian women's eight at the Tokyo 2020 Olympics.

Club and state rowing
Born in Victoria, Hawe's initial senior rowing was from the Huon Rowing Club in Tasmania. She won a scholarship to the Tasmanian Institute of Sport.

She has contested national titles at the Australian Rowing Championships in Huon Rowing Club colours on number of occasions and in 2017 won titles in all three sweep-oared women's boat classes. She won open women's coxless pair with Meaghan Volker, the open coxless four title in an Tasmanian composite crew and the open women's eight title. In 2018 she won the open women's coxless pair national title with Molly Goodman.
 In 2021 in a National Training Centre eight she won the open women's eight title at the Australian Championships.  At the Australian Rowing Championships in 2022 she again won the open women's coxed eight national title in a composite Australian selection crew.

In 2014 and 2015 Hawe was selected in the Tasmanian senior women's eights contesting the Queen's Cup at the Interstate Regatta within the Australian Rowing Championships. Eligible in 2018 to race for Victoria she was selected in the Victorian senior women's eight who won that year's Queen's Cup at the Interstate Regatta. In 2021 she was in the four seat of the Victorian women's eight in their Queen's Cup victory. 

Sarah is also a member of the Tasmanian Institute of Sport.

International representative rowing
Hawe first represented Australia in a double scull at the 2005 Junior World Rowing Championships in Brandenburg. That crew placed fifth.

Hawe was not called back into national selection until 2017 when she was chosen in Australia's coxless four with Lucy Stephan, Molly Goodman, and Katrina Werry. They competed at the World Rowing Cups II & III and as a foursome they didn't lose a race in the international season. At the 2017 World Rowing Championships in Sarasota, Florida it was to be no different. They won their heat and started slow in the final sitting in sixth place at the 500m and fifth place at the 1000m mark. In third 500m they began to push on the Dutch and were joined by Poland & Russia all challenging for the podium. In the final sprint, Stephan called Goodman to up the rating and at 43 strokes per minute the Australian four surged into the lead to claim gold and the world championships title ahead of Poland & Russia.

With Katrina Werry changed out for Rosemary Popa the world champion four stayed together into 2018 and started their 2018 international campaign with a gold medal win at the World Rowing Cup II in Linz, Austria. In their second competitive outing of the 2018 international season in an Australian selection eight and racing as the Georgina Hope Rinehart National Training Centre, after Rowing Australia patron, Gina Rinehart, Hawe won the 2018 Remenham Challenge Cup at the Henley Royal Regatta. The following week back in the coxless four, Hawe won another gold at the World Rowing Cup III in Lucerne. By the time of 2018 World Rowing Championships Popa was out of the four with an injury and Kat Werry back in. Seated as they had been in 2017, the Australian four won their heat, were surprised by a new combination USA crew in the semi and then in the final placed second to the US and finished with world championship silver.

In 2019 Hawe was again picked in Australian women's sweep squad for the international season. For the two Rowing World Cups in Europe, Hawe was seated at three in the Australian coxless four and rowed to a bronze medal at RWC II in Poznan and to a gold medal at WRC III in Rotterdam. Hawe, Aldersey, Werry and Stephan were selected to race Australia's coxless four at the 2019 World Rowing Championships in Linz, Austria. The four were looking for a top eight finish at the 2019 World Championships to qualify for the Tokyo Olympics. They won their heat and semi-final, thereby qualifying the boat for Tokyo 2020. They led the final from start to finish, took the gold medal and regained their world champion title.  

At the Tokyo 2020 Olympics the Australian women's eight were placed third in their heat, fourth in the repechage and fifth in the Olympic A final. Had they managed to maintain their time of 5:57:15 that they achieved in their repechage they would have beaten the winners, Canada, by nearly two seconds and won the gold medal.In Tokyo the Australian women's eight placed third in their heat, fourth in the repechage and fifth in the Olympic A final.

References

External links

1987 births
Living people
Australian female rowers
World Rowing Championships medalists for Australia
Sportswomen from Victoria (Australia)
Rowers at the 2020 Summer Olympics
Olympic rowers of Australia
21st-century Australian women